Listed below are the dates and results for the 1998 FIFA World Cup qualification rounds for the African zone (CAF). For an overview of the qualification rounds, see the article 1998 FIFA World Cup qualification.

A total of 38 CAF teams entered the competition. However, Mali and Niger both withdrew before the draw was made. The African Zone was allocated five places (out of 32) in the final tournament.

Summary
There would be two rounds of play:
First Round: Cameroon, Nigeria, Morocco and Egypt, the four highest-ranked teams according to FIFA, received byes and advanced to the Final Round directly. The remaining 32 teams were paired up to play knockout matches on a home-and-away basis. The winners would advance to the Final Round.
Final Round: The 20 teams were divided into five groups of four teams each. The teams would play against each other on a home-and-away basis. The group winners would qualify. These were:

First round

|}

First Leg

Second Leg

Burkina Faso won 2–0 on aggregate

Namibia won 3–1 on aggregate

South Africa won 4–0 on aggregate

Angola won 5–1 on aggregate

Guinea won 5–4 on aggregate

Liberia won 5–2 on aggregate

Gabon won 3–0 on aggregate

Burundi won 2–0 on aggregate but withdrew before the Final Round started, so their place was given to Sierra Leone.

Zimbabwe won 4–3 on aggregate

Congo won 3–1 on aggregate

Zaire won 7–1 on aggregate

Tunisia won 5–1 on aggregate

Kenya won 3–2 on aggregate

Togo won 3–2 on aggregate

Zambia won 3–2 on aggregate

Ghana won 2–1 on aggregate

Final round

Key:
Teams highlighted in green qualified for the finals.

Group 1

Group 2

Group 3

In May 1997, Zaire were renamed the Democratic Republic of the Congo (Congo DR).

Group 4

Group 5

Gabon vs Sierra Leone was not played, since neither team could advance with a win.

Match abandoned after 53 minutes due to crowd trouble. FIFA allowed the result to stand

Match postponed due to Sierra Leone not being able to travel from Freetown due to conflict. The match was never rearranged due to the result having no effect on final group standings

Qualified teams
The following five teams from CAF qualified for the final tournament.

1 Bold indicates champions for that year. Italic indicates hosts for that year.

Goalscorers
There were 229 goals scored in 91 matches, for an average of 2.52 goals per match.
5 goals

 Paulão
 Mamadou Zongo
 Mike Okoth Origi
 Vitalis Takawira

4 goals

 Patrick Mboma
 Hossam Hassan
 Titi Camara
 Momo Soumah
 Salaheddine Bassir
 Daniel Amokachi
 Phil Masinga
 Adel Sellimi

3 goals

 Akwá
 Alphonse Tchami
 Macchambes Younga-Mouhani
 Ali Maher
 Fodé Camara
 Ahmed Bahja
 Khalid Raghib
 Zoubeir Baya

2 goals

 Paulo Jorge da Silva
 Bernard Tchoutang
 Olivier Niere
 Hady Khashaba
 Mohammed Gargo
 Samuel Johnson
 Souleymane Oularé
 Cipriano Co
 Pereira Tavares
 Musa Otieno
 Kennedy Simiyu
 Maurice Sunguti
 James Debbah
 George Weah
 Mohammed Ouseb
 Eliphas Shivute
 Gervatius Uri Khob
 Emmanuel Amunike
 Shaun Bartlett
 Bachirou Salou
 Kossi Noutsoudje
 Djima Oyawolé
 Khaled Badra
 Elos Elonga-Ekakia
 Michel Ngonge
 Mbuleya Tondelva
 Frazer Kamwandi
 Dennis Lota
 Andrew Tembo

1 goal

 Abdelhafid Tasfaout
 Sid Ahmed Zerrouki
 Fernando Manuel Sousa
 Joaquim Alberto Silva
 Kassoum Ouédraogo
 Firmin Sanou
 Ousmane Sanou
 Brahima Traore
 Jean-Marie Mbuyi
 Sutche Wambo
 Jean-Jacques Missé-Missé
 Christian Bongo
 Charles Imboula
 Sousa Miyamou
 Lassina Dao
 Hazem Emam
 Hesham Hanafy
 Ahmed Hassan
 Ibrahim Hassan
 Samir Kamouna
 Abdel Sattar Sabry
 Brice Mackaya
 Anicet Yala Ngoukou
 Théodore Nzue Nguema
 Jonas Ogandaga
 Abdul Aziz Corr
 Ebrima Ebou Sillah
 Felix Aboagye
 Augustine Ahinful
 Arthur Moses
 Abedi Pele
 Tibou Bangoura
 Vincent Kwarula
 Henry Motego
 Francis Were
 Robert Clarke
 Prince Daye
 Oliver Makor
 Jiana Raoelijaona
 Etienne Hajason Rasoanaivo
 Etienne Rado Rasoanaivo
 Antoine Mocude
 Youssef Fertout
 El Arbi Hababi
 Mustapha Hadji
 Noureddine Naybet
 Armando Macamo
 Ewald Hoeseb
 Johannes Ortmann
 Simon Uutoni
 Mutiu Adepoju
 Jonathan Akpoborie
 Sunday Oliseh
 Wilson Oruma
 Leon Mupenzi
 Mamadou Diallo
 Omar Traoré
 Jamiru Amidu
 Lamin Conteh
 Mohamed Kallon
 Abu Kanu
 Mark Fish
 Doctor Khumalo
 Helman Mkhalele
 Eric Tinkler
 Mark Williams
 Khalid Ahmed Elmustafa
 Anas Elnour
 Mohamed Daima
 Kokouni Akpalo Gnavor
 Lantame Ouadja
 Tadjou Salou
 Mehdi Ben Slimane
 Hédi Berkhissa
 Taoufik Herichi
 Riadh Jelassi
 Jameleddine Limam
 Skander Souayah
 Robert Kizito
 Epotele Bazamba
 Emeka Mamale
 Nzelo Hervé Lembi
 Étienne N'tsunda
 Zico Tumba
 Johnson Bwalya
 Kenneth Malitoli
 Mwape Miti
 Vincent Mutale
 Kennedy Chihuri
 Edelbert Dinha
 Adam Ndlovu
 Agent Sawu
 Cloudious Zviripayi

1 own goal

 Mohamadi Balma (playing against Guinea)
 Abu Kamara (playing against Ghana)

External links
RSSSF Page
Fifa.com Information

CAF
FIFA World Cup qualification (CAF)
Qual
Qual